Baba Hesari (also Romanized as Bābā Ḩeşārī) is a village in Pish Khowr Rural District, Pish Khowr District, Famenin County, Hamadan Province, Iran. At the 2006 census, its population was 125, in 32 families.

References 

Populated places in Famenin County